The 2006 Pan American Men's Handball Championship was the twelfth edition of the tournament, held in Aracaju, Brazil from 6 to 10 June 2006. It acted as the American qualifying tournament for the 2007 World Championship, where the top three placed team qualied.

Preliminary round
All times are local (UTC−2).

Group A

Group B

Knockout stage

Bracket

Fifth place bracket

5–8th place semifinals

Semifinals

Seventh place game

Fifth place game

Third place game

Final

Final ranking

External links
 Results on todor66.com

Pan American Men's Handball Championship
2006 in handball
2006 in Brazilian sport
International handball competitions hosted by Brazil
June 2006 sports events in South America